Christian Kurts (born 27 November 1964 in Helmstedt, Germany) is a German immunologist and nephrologist.

Career
Since 2009, Christian Kurts has been the Director Institute of Experimental Immunology, University Hospital Bonn, University of Bonn, Germany. In 2016, he founded the Bonn & Melbourne Research and Graduate training group (Bo&MeRanG) and remains a Co-Spokesperson of the Deutsche Forschungsgemeinschaft-funded program.

Scientific interests
Christian Kurts in known for publications in the fields of cross-presentation, and immune tolerance as well as his work on the function of dendritic cells in a variety of organs, with a particular focus on the urogenital tract.

Awards
In 2012, he shared the Gottfried Wilhelm Leibniz Prize with Gunther Hartmann for their "seminal discoveries concerning the mode of action of the body’s endogenous defence systems."

References

Gottfried Wilhelm Leibniz Prize winners
German immunologists
German medical researchers
German nephrologists
1964 births
Living people
Physicians from Lower Saxony